The Royal Households of the United Kingdom consist of royal officials and the supporting staff of the British royal family, as well as the Royal Household which supports the Sovereign. Each member of the Royal Family who undertakes public duties has their own separate household.

When Elizabeth II was still a Princess she married Prince Philip, Duke of Edinburgh on 20 November 1947. After that marriage they shared the Household of the Duke and Duchess of Edinburgh.

When she succeeded her father George VI as sovereign of the United Kingdom, she appointed a new household, known as the Household of the Sovereign 1952-2022.

The Duke of Edinburgh then received a separate household upon his wife's accession, the Household of the Duke of Edinburgh until his death in 2021.

With the passing of the Queen on 8 September 2022 the Household of the Sovereign passed to her son, the new King Charles III.

Great officers of the Household

Lord Chamberlain

The Lord Chamberlain of the Household is the highest-ranking official of the Royal Household of the United Kingdom, overseeing the departments that support and provide advice to the Sovereign of the United Kingdom, while also acting as the main channel of communication between the Sovereign and the House of Lords.

Vice Chamberlain

The Vice-Chamberlain of the Household is usually a junior government whip in the British House of Commons and is the Deputy to the Lord Chamberlain. The Vice Chamberlain's main duties are to compile a daily private report for the Sovereign on the proceedings in the House of Commons and to transmit addresses from the Commons to the Sovereign and vice versa.

Lord Steward

The Lord Steward of the Household manages the Treasurer of the Household and Comptroller of the Household, who rank next to him. The appointee is always a peer, and is the first dignitary of the court.

Treasurer of the Household

The Treasurer of the Household is usually held by one of the government deputy Chief Whips in the House of Commons. The Treasurer is automatically a member of the privy council.

Comptroller of the Household

The Comptroller of the Household is nominally the second-ranking member of the Lord Steward's department after the Treasurer of the Household. In recent times, a senior government whip has invariably occupied the office. On state occasions the Comptroller, in common with certain other senior officers of the Household, carries a white staff of office, as often seen in portraits.

Master of the Horse

The Master of the Horse is the third dignitary of the court. It is a primarily ceremonial office, and rarely appears except on state occasions, and especially when the Sovereign is mounted. There are still several pages of honour who are nominally in the master of the horse's department. They are youths aged from twelve to sixteen, selected by the sovereign in person, to attend on him at state ceremonies.

Private Secretary's Office

Private Secretary to the Sovereign
5 August 1952: The Right Honourable Sir Alan Frederick Lascelles, GCVO, KCB, CMG, MC

Assistant Private Secretaries
 5 August 1952: Major Sir Michael Edward Adeane, KCVO, CB
 5 August 1952: Major Edward William Spencer Ford, CB, MVO
 5 August 1952: Lieutenant-Colonel the Honourable Martin Michael Charles Wemyss Charteris, OBE

Press Secretary
5 August 1952: Commander (S) Richard Colville, MVO, DSC, RN

Privy Purse and Treasurer's Office

Keeper of the Privy Purse and Treasurer to The Queen
5 August 1952: The Right Honourable Sir James Ulick Francis Canning Alexander, GCVO, KCB, CMG, OBE

Deputy Treasurer to The Queen and Secretary of the Privy Purse
5 August 1952: Commander (S) Sir Dudley Colles, KCVO, OBE, RN

Assistant Keeper of the Privy Purse
5 August 1952: Brigadier The Right Honourable Charles George Vivian, Baron Tryon, DSO

Almonry

High Almoner
5 August 1952: The Right Reverend Edward Sydney Woods, DD, Lord Bishop of Lichfield

Sub-Almoner
5 August 1952: The Reverend Maurice Frederic Foxell, MVO, MA

Pages of Honour
 5 August 1952: Henry Charles Seymour, Esquire
 5 August 1952: Michael Anson, Esquire
 5 August 1952: Jonathan Sidney Peel, Esquire
 5 August 1952: The Right Honourable Henry George Victor John, Earl of Erne

Lord Chamberlain's Office

Comptroller, Lord Chamberlain's Office
5 August 1952: Lieutenant-Colonel Sir Terence Edmund Gascoigne Nugent, GCVO, MC

Assistant Comptroller, Lord Chamberlain's Office
5 August 1952: Brigadier Sir Norman Wilmshurst Gwatkin, KCVO, DSO

Royal Mews Department

Crown Equerry
5 August 1952: Colonel Sir Dermot McMorrough Kavanagh, KCVO

Marshal of the Diplomatic Corps
5 August 1952: Major-General Arthur Guy Salisbury-Jones, CMG, CBE, MC

Vice-Marshal of the Diplomatic Corps
5 August 1952: Marcus John Cheke, Esquire, CVO

Assistant Marshal of the Diplomatic Corps
5 August 1952: Captain Sir John Lindsay Dashwood, Bt, CVO

The Master of the Household's Department

Master of the Household

 5 August 1952: Lieutenant-Colonel the Honourable Sir Piers Walter Legh, GCVO, CMG, CIE, OBE

Lords in Waiting
 5 August 1952: Colonel the Right Honourable Clive, Baron Wigram, GCB, GCVO, CSI (Permanent)
 5 August 1952: The Right Honourable Rowland Thomas, Earl of Cromer, GCB, GCIE, GCVO (Permanent)
 5 August 1952: The Right Honourable John, Earl of Eldon, KCVO
 5 August 1952: The Right Honourable Wentworth Henry Canning, Viscount Allendale, KG, CB, CBE, MC
 5 August 1952: The Right Honourable Frederick Winston Furneaux, Earl of Birkenhead.
 5 August 1952: The Right Honourable George Nigel, Earl of Selkirk, GBE, AFC
 5 August 1952: The Right Honourable Alexander David Frederick, Baron Lloyd, MBE

Equerries

Equerries 
 5 August 1952: Captain Sir Harold George Campbell, KCVO, DSO, RN
 5 August 1952: Major Sir Michael Edward Adeane, KCVO, CB

Temporary Equerries
 5 August 1952: Group Captain Peter Wooldridge Townsend, CVO, DSO, DFC
 5 August 1952: Captain Edward John Spencer, Viscount Althorp
 5 August 1952: Captain the Right Honourable Patrick Terence William Span, Baron Plunket

Extra Equerries
 5 August 1952: Colonel Sir John Renton Aird, Bt, MVO, MC
 5 August 1952: The Right Honourable Sir James Ulick Francis Canning Alexander, GCVO, KCB, CMG, OBE
 5 August 1952: Commander Peter William Beckwith Ashmore, MVO, DSC, RN
 5 August 1952: Admiral the Honourable Sir Hubert George Brand, GCB, KCMG, KCVO
 5 August 1952: Commander Colin Buist, MVO, RN
 5 August 1952: Admiral Sir Henry Tritton Buller, GCVO, CB
 5 August 1952: Brigadier-General Sir Smith Hill Child, Bt, GCVO, CB, CMG, DSO
 5 August 1952: Lieutenant-General Sir George Sidney Clive, GCVO, KCB, CMG, DSO
 5 August 1952: The Right Honourable Rowland Thomas Baring, Earl of Cromer, GCB, GCIE, GCVO
 5 August 1952: Colonel Sir Arthur Edward Erskine, GCVO, DSO
 5 August 1952: Admiral the Honourable Sir Herbert Meade-Fetherstonhaugh, GCVO, CB, DSO
 5 August 1952: Air Commodore Sir Edward Hedley Fielden, KCVO, CB, DFC, AFC
 5 August 1952: Brigadier Walter Douglas Campbell Greenacre, CB, DSO, MVO
 5 August 1952: Brigadier Sir Norman Wilmshurst Gwatkin, KCVO, DSO
 5 August 1952: The Right Honourable Alexander Henry Louis Hardinge, Baron Hardinge of Penshurst, GCB, GCVO, MC
 5 August 1952: Vice-Admiral Charles Edward Lambe, CB, CVO
 5 August 1952: Lieutenant-Colonel the Honourable Sir Piers Walter Legh, GCVO, CMG, CIE, OBE
 5 August 1952: Major the Right Honourable Thomas William Edward Coke, Earl of Leicester, MVO
 5 August 1952: Lieutenant-Colonel Douglas William Alexander Dalziel Mackenzie, CVO, DSO
 5 August 1952: Captain Charles Joseph Henry O'Hara Moore, CVO, MC
 5 August 1952: Lieutenant-Colonel Ririd Myddelton, MVO
 5 August 1952: Admiral Sir Dudley Burton Napier North, GCVO, CB, CSI, CMG
 5 August 1952: Lieutenant-Colonel Sir Terence Edmund Gascoigne Nugent, GCVO, MC
 5 August 1952: Sir Arthur Horace Penn, KCVO, MC
 5 August 1952: Sir George Arthur Ponsonby, KCVO
 5 August 1952: Rear-Admiral Edward Michael Conolly Abel Smith, CB, CVO
 5 August 1952: Colonel the Right Honourable Clive Wigram, Baron Wigram, GCB, GCVO, CSI

Gentleman Ushers
 5 August 1952: Captain Humphrey Clifford Lloyd, MVO, MC
 5 August 1952: Lieutenant-Colonel Henry Valentine Bache de Satge, CMG, CVO, DSO
 5 August 1952: Rear-Admiral Sir Arthur Bromley, KCMG, CVO
 5 August 1952: Colonel Geoffrey Ronald Codrington, CB, CMG, CVO, DSO, OBE, TD
 5 August 1952: Captain William Duncan Phipps, MVO, RN
 5 August 1952: Captain (S) Sir Frank Todd Spickernell, KBE, CB, DSO, RN
 5 August 1952: Captain Philip Lloyd Neville, RN
 5 August 1952: Brigadier Guy Elland Carne Rasch, CVO, DSO
 5 August 1952: Air Vice-Marshal Sir George Ranald Macfarlane Reid, KCB, DSO, MC

Extra Gentlemen Ushers
 5 August 1952: Major Gerald Montagu Augustus Ellis
 5 August 1952: Lieutenant-Colonel Sir Arthur D'Arcy
 5 August 1952: Gordon Bannerman, Bt, KCVO, CIE
 5 August 1952: Group Captain Sir Louis Greig, KBE, CVO
 5 August 1952: Major the Honourable John Spencer Coke, CVO
 5 August 1952: Captain Charles Alexander Lindsay Irvine, CVO, OBE
 5 August 1952: Sir John Hanbury-Williams
 5 August 1952: Sir John Berkeley Monck, GCVO, CMG
 5 August 1952: Sir Algar Henry Stafford Howard, KCB, KCVO, MC, TD
 5 August 1952: Captain Andrew Vavasour Scott Yates, RN
 5 August 1952: Major Thomas Cockayne Harvey, CVO, DSO
 5 August 1952: Lieutenant-Colonel Frederick Edward Packe, CVO, OBE

Gentleman Usher to the Sword of State

5 August 1952: Air Chief Marshal Sir Arthur Sheridan Barratt, KCB, CMG, MC

Ecclesiastical Household

College of Chaplains

Clerk of the Closet
5 August 1952: The Right Reverend Percy Mark Herbert, DD, Lord Bishop of Norwich.

Deputy Clerk of the Closet
5 August 1952: The Reverend Maurice Frederic Foxell, MVO, MA

Chaplains
 5 August 1952: The Reverend Canon Travers Guy Rogers, MC, BD
 5 August 1952: The Reverend Canon Charles Earle Raven, DD, DSC
 5 August 1952: The Reverend Arthur Rowland Harry Grant, CVO, TD, DD
 5 August 1952: The Reverend Canon William John Telia Phythian Phythian-Adams, DSO, MC, DD
 5 August 1952: The Reverend Philip Thomas Byard Clayton, CH, MC, MA
 5 August 1952: The Reverend Canon Leonard Martin Andrews, CVO, MBE, MC, MA
 5 August 1952: The Reverend Canon Henry Spencer Stephenson, MA
 5 August 1952: The Reverend Canon Frank Hay Gillingham, BA
 5 August 1952: The Reverend Thomas Malcolm Layng, CBE, MC, MA.
 5 August 1952: The Reverend Henry Edward FitzHerbert, MA
 5 August 1952: The Reverend Canon Sidney Ernest Swann, MA
 5 August 1952: The Reverend Reginald French, MC, MA
 5 August 1952: The Reverend Canon Ellis Foster Edge Partington, MC, MA
 5 August 1952: The Venerable Frederick Boreham, MA
 5 August 1952: The Reverend Canon John McLeod Campbell, MC, DD
 5 August 1952: The Reverend Albert Victor Baillie, KCVO, DD
 5 August 1952: The Reverend Canon Arthur Stretton Reeve, MA
 5 August 1952: The Reverend Robert Reginald Churchill, CBE, MA
 5 August 1952: The Reverend Humphrey Gordon Barclay, CVO, MC
 5 August 1952: The Reverend Ralph Creed Meredith, MA
 5 August 1952: The Venerable Charles Henry Ritchie, MA
 5 August 1952: The Reverend Prebendary Walter Gordon Arrowsmith, MA
 5 August 1952: The Reverend Prebendary Hubert Harold Treacher
 5 August 1952: The Reverend Canon Ian Hugh White-Thomson, MA
 5 August 1952: The Reverend Prebendary George Frederick Saywell, MA
 5 August 1952: The Reverend Canon Eric Symes Abbott, MA
 5 August 1952: The Reverend Canon Wallace Harold Elliott, MA
 5 August 1952: The Reverend Canon Ralph Layard Whytehead, MA
 5 August 1952: The Reverend Peter Llewellyn Gillingham, MA
 5 August 1952: The Reverend Lewis Mervyn Charles Edwards.
 5 August 1952: The Reverend Canon Leslie George Mannering, MC, MA
 5 August 1952: The Venerable Arthur Selwyn Bean, MBE, BD
 5 August 1952: The Reverend Canon John Farquhar Richardson, MA
 5 August 1952: The Reverend Canon Robert Wright Stopford, CBE., DCL, MA

Chapels Royal

Dean
5 August 1952: The Right Reverend and Right Honourable John William Charles Wand, DD, Lord Bishop of London.

Sub-Dean
5 August 1952: The Reverend Maurice Frederic Foxell, MVO, MA

Priests
 5 August 1952: The Reverend Cyril Moxon Armitage, MVO, MA
 5 August 1952: The Reverend Erik Francis Donne, MA
 5 August 1952: The Reverend George Ernest Sage, MA

Deputy-Priests
 5 August 1952: The Reverend Michael Ridley, MA
 5 August 1952: The Reverend Canon Anthony Lewis Elliott Williams, MA
 5 August 1952: The Reverend Cyril Theodore Henry Dams, MA

Honorary Priest
5 August 1952: The Reverend Trevitt Reginald Hine-Haycock, MVO, MA

Organist, Choirmaster and Composer at Her Majesty's Chapels Royal
5 August 1952: Edgar Stanley Roper, Esquire, CVO, MusD

Domestic Chaplains
 5 August 1952: The Reverend Maurice Frederic Foxell, MVO, MA (Buckingham Palace)
 5 August 1952: The Right Reverend Eric Knightley Chetwode Hamilton, MA, Dean of Windsor (Windsor Castle)
 5 August 1952: The Reverend Hector David Anderson, MVO, BD (Sandringham)

Chaplain, Royal Chapel, Windsor Great Park
5 August 1952: The Reverend Peter Llewellyn Gillingham, MA

Chaplain, Hampton Court Palace
5 August 1952: The Reverend Prebendary Herbert Harris, MA

Organist, Hampton Court Palace
5 August 1952: William James Phillips, Esquire, Mus.Doc.

Chaplains in Scotland
 5 August 1952: The Very Reverend Charles Laing Warr, KCVO, DD, LLD
 5 August 1952: The Very Reverend James Hutchison Cockburn, DD
 5 August 1952: The Reverend Andrew Nevile Davidson, DD
 5 August 1952: The Very Reverend John Baillie, DD, DLitt, LLD
 5 August 1952: The Very Reverend William White Anderson, MC, DD
 5 August 1952: The Reverend Thomas Bentley Stewart Thomson, MC, TD, DD
 5 August 1952: The Reverend Professor James Pitt Watson, DD
 5 August 1952: The Reverend Professor James Stuart Stewart, DD
 5 August 1952: The Reverend John Annand Fraser, MBE, TD, DD

Domestic Chaplain
5 August 1952: The Reverend John Lamb, CVO, BD (Balmoral).

Medical Household

Physicians
 5 August 1952: Horace Evans, 1st Baron Evans, GCVO, MD, FRCP (died 26 October 1963).
 5 August 1952: Sir John Weir, GCVO, MB, ChB, FFHom (retired 31 December 1968).
 5 August 1952: Sir Ronald Bodley Scott, KCVO, MA, BM, BCh, DM, FRCP (until 1973).
 17 March 1964: William Neville Mann, MD, FRCP (succeeding Lord Evans; resigned 20 March 1970).
 31 December 1968: Margery Grace Blackie, CVO, MD, MB, BS, MRCS, LRCP, FFHom (retired 31 October 1980).
 20 March 1970: Richard Ian Samuel Bayliss, MD, FRCP (until 1982).
 December 1974: Sir John Charles Batten, KCVO, MD, BS, FRCP (until 1989).
 31 October 1980: Charles Kennedy Elliott, MB, MRCGP, FFHom (retired 20 March 1986).
 2 January 1982: Anthony Michael Dawson, MD, BS, FRCP (until 1993).
 20 March 1986: Ronald William Davey, LVO, MD, FFHom, AKC (until 2001).
 1993: Richard Paul Hepworth Thompson, DM, FRCP (until 2005).
 2001: Peter Anthony Goodwin Fisher, MA, MB, BChir, FFHom, FRCP, FRSocMed (died 15 August 2018).
 2005: Professor John Cunningham, CVO, BA, BM, BCh, DM, FRCP (until 2014).
 2014: Professor Sir Huw Thomas, KCVO, FRCP.

Physicians to the Household 
 17 March 1964: Richard Ian Samuel Bayliss, MD, FRCP (promoted 20 March 1970).
 20 March 1970: John Charles Batten, MD, BS, FRCP (promoted December 1974).
 December 1974: Anthony Michael Dawson, MD, BS, FRCP (promoted 2 January 1982).
 2 January 1982: Richard Paul Hepworth Thompson, DM, FRCP (promoted 1993).

Physician-Paediatrician
 5 August 1952: Wilfrid Percy Henry Sheldon, MD, FRCP (1 January 1972).
 1 January 1972: Philip Rainsford Evans, CBE, MSc, MD, ChB, FRCP (until 1976).

Extra Physicians
 5 August 1952: The Right Honourable Thomas Jeeves Horder, 1st Baron Horder, GCVO, MD, BSc, FRCP
 5 August 1952: Sir Henry Letheby Tidy, KBE, MD, FRCP
 5 August 1952: Sir Daniel Thomas Davies, KCVO, MD, BSc, FRCP

Sergeant-Surgeon
 5 August 1952: Sir Arthur Espie Porritt, KCMG, CBE., MB, MCh, FRCS
 1 September 1967: Sir Ralph Marnham, KCVO, MChir, FRCS
 1 January 1972: Sir Edward Grainger Muir, MS, FRCS
 20 March 1973: Sir Edward Tuckwell, KCVO, MCh, FRCS
 12 May 1975: Sir Hugh Evelyn Lockhart-Mummery, KCVO, MD, MChir, FRCS, LRCP
 29 April 1983: William Willatt Slack, Esquire, MCh, FRCS
 23 February 1990: John Leonard Dawson, CVO, MS, FRCS
 22 February 1991: Barry Trevor Jackson, MS, FRCS (retired 2001).
 3 December 2001: Adam Anthony Murless Lewis, MB, BS, FRCS, FRCSE (retired 1 November 2006).
 4 January 2007: Roger Henry Vickers, MA, BM, BCh, FRCS (until 2010).
 25 July 2010: Professor Sir George Hamilton, MD, FRCS.
10 August 2016: Mr Satya Bhattacharya FRCS LVO

Surgeons
 5 August 1952: Professor Sir James Paterson Ross, KCVO, MS, FRCS (retired 17 March 1964).
 5 August 1952: Ralph Marnham, Esquire, MChir, FRCS (promoted 1 September 1967).
 17 March 1964: Edward Grainger Muir, MS, FRCS (promoted 1 January 1972).
 January 1969: Edward George Tuckwell, MCh, FRCS (promoted 20 March 1973).
 December 1974: Hugh Evelyn Lockhart-Mummery, MC, MChir, FRCS, LRCP (also Surgeon to Her Majesty's Household; promoted 12 May 1975)
 12 May 1975: William Willatt Slack, MCh, FRCS (promoted 29 April 1983).
 29 April 1983: John Leonard Dawson, MS, FRSC (promoted 23 February 1990).
 Roger Vickers (promoted 4 January 2007).
 4 January 2007: George Hamilton (promoted 25 July 2010).

Surgeon to Her Majesty's Household 
 17 March 1964: Edward George Tuckwell, MCh, FRCS
 January 1969: Hugh Evelyn Lockhart-Mummery, MD, MChir, FRCS, LRCP
 12 May 1975: John Leonard Dawson, MS, MB, FRCS
 29 April 1983: Barry Trevor Jackson, MS, FRCS
 22 February 1991: Adam Anthony Murless Lewis, MB, FRCS
 Professor George Hamilton (promoted 4 January 2007).
 4 January 2007: Mr Satyajit Bhattacharya
 10 August 2016: Mr Ian Jenkins MD FRCS

Surgeon-Gynaecologist/Surgeon-Gynaecologist to the Queen
 5 August 1952: Sir William Gilliatt, KCVO, MD, MS, FRCP, FRCS, FRCOG
 11 July 1961: Sir John Harold Peel, KCVO, FRCS, FRCOG (retired March 1973).
 March 1973: Sir George Douglas Pinker, KCVO, FRCS(Ed.), PRCOG (retired 30 March 1990).
 30 March 1990: Marcus Edward Setchell, MA, FRCS, FRCOG (until 2014).
 30 June 2014: Alan Farthing (incumbent).

Surgeon-Gynaecologist to the Household 
 18 November 2008: Alan Farthing (promoted 30 June 2014).
 30 June 2008: Guy Thorpe-Beeston (incumbent).

Extra Surgeons
 5 August 1952: Sir Thomas Peel Dunhill, GCVO, CMG, MD, FRCS, FRACS
 5 August 1952: Sir James Walton, KCVO, MB, M.S., BSc, FRCS, LRCP, F.G.A.
 5 August 1952: Sir Lancelot Edward Barrington-Ward, KCVO, ChM, FRCS

Extra Manipulative Surgeon
 5 August 1952: Sir Morton Smart, GCVO, DSO, MD

Extra Surgeon-Apothecary
 5 August 1952: Sir Frederick Stanley Hewett, KCB, KCVO, KBE, MD, MRCS, LRCP

Surgeon-Oculist/Surgeon-Oculist to the Queen
 5 August 1952: Sir Stewart Duke-Elder, KCVO, DSc, PhD, MD, LLD, FRCS, FACS (resigned 30 April 1965).
 30 April 1965: Allen John Bridson Goldsmith, CVO, MB, BS, FRCS, LRCP (retired 27 November 1974).
 27 November 1974: Stephen James Hamilton Miller, MD, FRCS (retired 21 July 1980).
 21 July 1980: Sir Patrick John Holmes Sellors, KCVO, MA, BM, BCh, FRCS (retired 3 February 1999).
 3 February 1999: Timothy John ffytche, LVO, MB, BS, DO, FRCS (retired 7 March 2002).
 7 March 2002: Jonathan David Jagger, LVO, MB, BS, FRCS, FRCOphth (incumbent).

Extra Orthopaedic Surgeon
 5 August 1952: Sir Reginald Watson-Jones, FRCS, FRACS, FACS, MChOrth, BSc

Aurist
 5 August 1952: John Douglas McLaggan, CVO, MB, ChB, FRCS
 11 July 1961: James Cecil Hogg, Esquire, CVO, FRCS

Surgeon-Dentist
 5 August 1952: Sir Alan Cumbrae Rose McLeod, KCVO, FDS, RCS(Eng.), DDS (retired 1 September 1975).
 1 September 1975: Nicholas Anthony Sturridge, LDS, DDS, BDS (retired 19 July 2007).

Extra Physician to the Household
 5 August 1952: Sir Arnold Walmsley Stott, KBE, BCh, FRCP

Surgeon-Oculist to the Household
 5 August 1952: Allen John Bridson Goldsmith, MB, BS, FRCS, LRCP (promoted 30 April 1965).
 30 April 1965: Stephen James Hamilton Miller, MD, FRCS (promoted 27 November 1974).
 27 November 1974: Patrick John Holmes Sellors, BM, BCh, FRCS (promoted 21 July 1980).
 21 July 1980: Timothy John ffytche, FRCS, MRCS, LRCP, DO (promoted 3 February 1999).
 3 February 1999: Jonathan David Jagger, MB, BS, FRCS, FRCOphth (promoted 7 March 2002).
 1 January 2002: Veronica Mary Geneste Ferguson, LVO, MB, BS, FRCS, FRCOphth (incumbent).

Extra Surgeon-Oculist to the Household
 5 August 1952: Frank Anderson Juler, CVO, MB, BCh, FRCS.
 30 April 1965: Sir Stewart Duke-Elder, GCVO, DSc, PhD, MD, LLD, FRCS, FRCP, FACS.

Apothecary to the Household
 5 August 1952: Sir John Nigel Loring, KCVO, MRCS, LRCP (retired 1 October 1964).
 1 October 1964: Sir Ralph Southward, KCVO, MB, ChB, MRCP (retired 1 January 1975).
 1 January 1975: Nigel Ralph Southward, MB, BChir, MRCP (retired 7 February 2003).
 7 February 2003: Timothy Hugh David Evans, MB, BS, MRCS, LRCP, DRCOG, MRCGP (incumbent).

Surgeon-Apothecary to the Household at Windsor
 5 August 1952: Richard William Legerton May, MB, BCh(Cantab.), MRCS, LRCP (resigned 9 March 1965).
 9 March 1965: John Pilkington Clayton, CVO, MA, MB, BChir, MRCS, LRCP (retired 13 July 1986).
 13 July 1986: John Hubert Daly Briscoe, MA, MB, BChir, MRCGP, DObst, RCOG (retired 29 June 1997).
 29 June 1997: Jonathan Holliday.

Extra Surgeon-Apothecary to the Household at Windsor
 5 August 1952: Edmund Claud Maiden, CVO, MB, BChir, MRCS, LRCP

Surgeon-Apothecary to the Household at Sandringham
 5 August 1952: James Lawrence Bunting Ansell, MVO, MRCS, LRCP (resigned 1 November 1965).
 1 November 1965: Hugh Kelson Ford, CVO, MB, BS, DObst, RCOG (retired 22 February 1992).
 22 February 1992: Ian Keith Campbell, BSc, MB, BS, DRCOG, FRCGP.

Medical Household in Scotland

Physicians
 5 August 1952: Alexander Greig Anderson, Esquire, CVO, LLD, MD, FRCP 
 5 August 1952: Professor Sir John William McNee, DSO, DSc, MD, FRCP, FRSE 
 5 August 1952: Professor Leybourne Stanley Patrick Davidson, MD, FRCP, FRSE

Surgeons
 5 August 1952: Professor Sir James Rognvald Learmonth, KCVO, CBE, MB, ChM, FRCSE 
 5 August 1952: George Gordon Bruce, Esquire, MB, ChB, FRCS, LRCP

Surgeon-Oculist
 5 August 1952: John Marshall, Esquire, MC, TD, MB, ChB, F.R.F.P.S.G.

Surgeon-Dentist
 5 August 1952: Robert Charles Scott Dow Esquire, LRCP, LRCS, HDD, FDS.

Surgeon-Apothecary to the Household at Balmoral
 5 August 1952: George Proctor Middleton, Esquire, CVO, MB, ChB

Surgeon-Apothecary to the Household at the Palace of Holyroodhouse
Surgeon-Apothecaries/Apothecaries to HM Household at the Palace of Holyroodhouse

 1908 – 1922: Dr W.B. Alexander (1844 – 1922)
 1923 – 1929: Dr D.J. Graham (1871 – 1929
 1930: Dr W.M. Taylor (1872 – 1930
 1931 – 1951: Dr N.J. Carmichael (1883 – 1951
 1952 – 1970: Dr G. Brewster (1899 – 1991
 1970 – 1986: Dr D.G. Illingworth (1921 – 2010)
 1987 – 1990: Dr H.H. Gebbie (b. 1930)
 1991 – 2001: Dr J.J.C. Cormack (1934 – 2002)
 2001—: Prof. J.R. Robertson (b. 1951)
 2016—: Dr Robin Balfour (b. 1961)

Military establishment

Gentlemen-at-Arms

Captain
5 August 1952: Colonel the Right Honourable Hugh William, Earl Fortescue, KG, CB, OBE, MC

Lieutenant
5 August 1952: Brigadier-General Sir Robert Harvey Kearsley, KCVO, CMG, DSO

Clerk of the Cheque and Adjutant
5 August 1952: Lieutenant-Colonel the Honourable Osbert Eustace Vesey, CMG, CBE.
2016: Christopher Mackenzie-Beevor, CBE

Gentlemen of the Corps
 5 August 1952: Colonel Sir Edward Philip Le Breton.
 5 August 1952: Lieutenant-Colonel Ughtred Elliott Carnegy Carnegy, DSO, MC
 5 August 1952: Brigadier Harold Vincent Spencer Charrington, DSO, MC
 5 August 1952: Major Sir Henry Lancelot Aubrey-Fletcher, Bt, DSO, MVO
 5 August 1952: Lieutenant-Colonel William Wallace Smith Cuninghame, DSO
 5 August 1952: Lieutenant-Colonel the Most Honourable James Arthur Norman, Marquess of Ormonde, MC
 5 August 1952: Colonel Bartle Mordaunt Marsham Edwards, M.C
 5 August 1952: Colonel Robert Henry Walsh, DSO, OBE, MC
 5 August 1952: Brigadier Lancelot Merivale Gibbs, CVO, DSO, MC
 5 August 1952: Lieutenant-Colonel Rupert Trevor Wallace Glynn, MC
 5 August 1952: Colonel the Right Honourable Edward Kenelm, Baron Digby, DSO, MC, TD
 5 August 1952: Brigadier Henry Walter Houldsworth, DSO, MC, TD
 5 August 1952: Lieutenant-Colonel John Forrester Colvin, OBE, MC
 5 August 1952: Lieutenant-Colonel Kenneth Edward Previte, OBE
 5 August 1952: Brigadier Thomas Fairfax-Ross, MC, TD
 5 August 1952: Major-General William Augustus Fitzgerald Lane Fox-Pitt, DSO, MVO, MC
 5 August 1952: Brigadier John Norman Cheney, OBE
 5 August 1952: Lieutenant-Colonel Francis Edgar Anthony Fulford.
 5 August 1952: Brigadier Sir Henry Robert Kincaid Floyd, Bt, CB, CBE.
 5 August 1952: Colonel Sir Robert Eric Sherlock Gooch, Bt, DSO
 5 August 1952: Lieutenant-Colonel William Heathcoat Amory, DSO
 5 August 1952: Colonel Sir John Gawen Carew Pole, Bt, DSO, TD
 5 August 1952: Brigadier Robert Bramston Thesiger Daniell, DSO
 5 August 1952: Brigadier Anthony Hilton Pepys, DSO
 5 August 1952: Lieutenant-Colonel Sir William Vivian Makins, Bt

Yeomen of the Guard

Captain
5 August 1952: The Right Honourable William Arthur Bampfylde, Earl of Onslow, MC, TD

Lieutenant
5 August 1952: Major-General Sir Allan Henry Shafto Adair, Bt, CB, DSO, MC

Clerk of the Cheque and Adjutant
5 August 1952: Lieutenant-Colonel Ralph Charles Bingham, DSO

Ensign
5 August 1952: Lieutenant-Colonel Victor Buller Turner, VC

Exons
5 August 1952: Brigadier William Greenwood Carr, DSO
Lieutenant-Colonel Gerald Hugh Grosvenor, DSO

Other appointments

Groom in Waiting
 5 August 1952: Sir Arthur Horace Penn, KCVO, MC

Extra Groom in Waiting 
 5 August 1952: The Right Honourable Montague Charles, Earl of St Germans, KCVO, OBE

Groom of the Robes
5 August 1952: Captain Sir Harold George Campbell, KCVO, DSO, RN

Parliament

Gentleman Usher of the Black Rod
5 August 1952: Lieutenant-General Sir Brian Gwynne Horrocks, KCB, KBE, DSO, MC

Sergeants-at-Arms
 5 August 1952: George Alfred Titman, Esquire, CBE, MVO
 5 August 1952: Lieutenant-Commander (S) Albert William Stone, MVO, MSM, RN
 5 August 1952: George Frederick Thomas Hopkins, Esquire, MVO, OBE, MC
 - February 2018: Brian Stanley, Esq.

Sergeant-at-Arms, House of Lords
5 August 1952: Air Vice-Marshal Sir Paul Copeland Maltby, KBE, CB, DSO, AFC

Sergeant-at-Arms, House of Commons
5 August 1952: Brigadier Sir Charles Alfred Howard, KCVO, DSO

The Queen's Archives

Keeper
5 August 1952: The Right Honourable Sir Alan Frederick Lascelles, GCVO, KCB, CMG, MC

Librarian
5 August 1952: Sir Owen Frederick Morshead, KCVO, DSO, MC

Keeper of the Jewel House, Tower of London
5 August 1952: Major-General Hervey Degge Wilmot Sitwell, CB, MC

Surveyor of The Queen's Pictures
5 August 1952: Professor Anthony Frederick Blunt, CVO

Deputy Surveyor of The Queen's Pictures
5 August 1952: Oliver Nicholas Millar, Esquire, FSA

Surveyor of The Queen's Works of Art
5 August 1952: Sir James Gow Mann, MA, B.Litt., PSA.
10 July 2019:Caroline de Guitaut, LVO. Appointed as deputy Surveyor of the Queen's Works of Art. 
Responsible for 700,000 works of art, at 13 royal palaces, including HM The Queen's official residences: Buckingham Palace, Windsor Castle, Palace of Holyroodhouse. 1st woman to hold the position.

Master of the Queen's Music
5 August 1952: Sir Arnold Edward Trevor Bax, MusDoc

Poet Laureate
5 August 1952: John Masefield, Esquire, OM, LitTD, LLD

Honorary Veterinary Surgeons
 5 August 1952: Captain Thomas Lewis Wright, Esquire, MRCVS
 5 August 1952: Edmond Scot Paterson, Esquire, MRCVS

Coroner of the Household
5 August 1952: Lieutenant-Colonel William Hilgrove Leslie McCarthy, DSO, MC, MD, MRCP

Captain of The Queen's Flight
5 August 1952: Air Commodore Sir Edward Hedley Fielden, KCVO, CB, DFC, AFC
15 February 1968:  Air Commodore Sir Archibald Winskill, KCVO, CBE, DFC & Bar, AE

Her Majesty's Representative at Ascot
5 August 1952: His Grace Bernard Marmaduke Fitzalan-Howard, 16th Duke of Norfolk, KG, GCVO

References

Royal households
Elizabeth II